Ricky Toner, born in Govan, Glasgow 1971, has been a singer/songwriter since 1990 performing with many bands including Dolphin, Fisher Price, North Starr, The Complete Stone Roses 1998 - 2001, Resurrection 2001 - present, Gluemaster, The Small Mountains, Coup d'etat, The Mind's Eye and most recently The Liberty Takers. Toner is also a DJ, promoter, manager, booking agent, light show technician The Mind's Eye Psychedelic Light Show & record company owner Red Telephone Records.

In his hometown of Livingston, Toner has been very much involved in the towns music scene since 1993. The book titled  Already In Me, about the life of Ian Brown  talks about The Complete Stone Roses when Toner was the singer. The book mentions Ian's unfortunate pull out of a gig at The Point Theatre in Dublin when he contacted Mani to ask If The Complete Stone Roses could do the gig instead, to a massive 6500 people. Ricky toured with and joined Mani (The Stone Roses/Primal Scream) on-stage at King Tut's Wah Wah Hut to perform 'She Bangs The Drums.' Having toured with Mani he has also toured with Clint Boon & Tom HIngley of Inspiral Carpets. The band at the time Ricky was the singer had celebrity fans from The Smiths, The Seahorses, Joy Division, Shed 7, The Stone Roses, Happy Mondays, Inspiral Carpets and 808 State. TV appearances have included BBC Ireland's music show The 11th Hour & STV News (Friday extended edition) among others.

References

Scottish songwriters
Living people
Year of birth missing (living people)